Jan B. Tankersley (born January 12, 1948) is an American politician from the state of Georgia. A Republican, she had represented District 158 since 2011 and was redistricted in 2013 to District 160 in the Georgia House of Representatives. She serves on the House Agricultural and Consumer Affairs Committee, Intragovernmental Coordination Committee, and the Natural Resources and Environment Committee.

Prior to serving in the State House, Tankersley was both a Bulloch County Commissioner and a member of the Brooklet, Georgia city council.

References

Republican Party members of the Georgia House of Representatives
Living people
Women state legislators in Georgia (U.S. state)
21st-century American politicians
21st-century American women politicians
People from Bulloch County, Georgia
1948 births